Taliesin Selley (born 20 April 1980) is a Welsh former rugby union footballer, who played either at centre or on the wing.

After five seasons at the Llanelli Scarlets he signed a three-year deal with the Ospreys where he played in the historic victory over Australia. He played on loan at the Cardiff Blues and the Newport Gwent Dragons. He made numerous appearances for the Barbarians as well as representing the Help for Heroes rugby team. Selley was the first player to play for all four Welsh regions. 
He also played many years as a junior for Pembroke Dock Harlequins.

National team
Selley toured with Wales to Argentina, South Africa, United States, and Canada and scored a try on his senior international debut for Wales in 2005 versus the United States in Hartford, Connecticut.

A regular for Wales on the IRB Sevens circuit, Selley remained the Wales national rugby sevens team's top try scorer with 60 tries, before being overtaken by Luke Morgan in 2016, and also the countries top point scorer in IRB Sevens history.  He played in the 2006 Melbourne Commonwealth Games.
   
Selley is a World Champion, when despite the odds of 80–1, Wales triumphed in Dubai in March 2009 and were crowned 2009 Rugby World Cup Sevens champions.  Selley also had the honour of being named "2009 Player of the Tournament", an award previously won by Lawrence Dallaglio (1993), Jonah Lomu (2001) and Waisale Serevi (2005).

References

External links
Newport Gwent Dragons profile
Cardiff Blues profile

1980 births
Living people
Birmingham & Solihull R.F.C. players
Cardiff Rugby players
Commonwealth Games rugby sevens players of Wales
Dragons RFC players
Male rugby sevens players
Ospreys (rugby union) players
Rugby sevens players at the 2006 Commonwealth Games
Rugby union centres
Rugby union players from Pembroke Dock
Rugby union wings
Scarlets players
Wales international rugby union players
Welsh rugby union players